The Kacchi Plain or Kachhi Plain is located in central Pakistan, in Balochistan Province.

History

Until the end of the 15th century Kacchi had been a dependency of Sindh. Around 1500, it was taken by Shah Beg of the Arghun Dynasty from the Samma Dynasty of the Sultans of Sindh. The territory was conquered by the Kalhoras Amirs of Sindh; they were displaced by the Nadir Shah of Persia and he made it the part of Kalat Khanate in 1740. Kachhi was notified as a district in February 1965. At that time Naseerabad, Jhal Magsi and Jafarabad districts were included; these were separated in 1987.

Geography

Plain
The Kacchi Plain is an arid plain with mountain ranges on three sides except to the east, located in:
the Kachhi District and Lasbela District 
the southern part of Sibi District, extending into the Nasirabad Division
the southern part of Dera Bugti District

Mountain ranges
There are three main mountain ranges in Balochistan: 
the Central Makran Range; 
the Siahan Range.

Archaeology
Mehrgarh is one of the most important neolithic sites (7000 BCE to c. 2500 BCE) in archaeology and is located in Kacchi Plain.

See also
Geography of Balochistan, Pakistan 
Makran

References

External links
 Balochistan Government
 Agriculturists in the Kachhi Plain, Balochistan
 Nomadic Pastoralists and Sedentary Agriculturists in the Kachhi Plain, Balochistan

See also
 Mehrgarh

Plains of Pakistan
Landforms of Balochistan (Pakistan)
Dera Bugti District
Kachhi District
Sibi District